The 22nd Toronto International Film Festival ran from September 4 to September 13, 1997. This festival was notable for the introduction of the Masters programme to TIFF.

Awards

Programmes

Gala Opening Night
 The Sweet Hereafter by Atom Egoyan

Gala Closing Night
 Seven Years in Tibet by Jean-Jacques Annaud

Gala Presentations
 The Apostle by Robert Duvall
 Artemisia by Agnès Merlet
 The Assignment by Christian Duguay
 Chinese Box by Wayne Wang
 The Edge by Lee Tamahori
 Eve's Bayou by Kasi Lemmons
 FairyTale: A True Story by Charles Sturridge
 Gattaca by Andrew Niccol
 In & Out by Frank Oz
 L.A. Confidential by Curtis Hanson
 Marquise by Véra Belmont
 Men with Guns by John Sayles
 Mrs Dalloway by Marleen Gorris
 Regeneration by Gillies MacKinnon
 Swept from the Sea by Beeban Kidron
 Washington Square by Agnieszka Holland
 The Wings of the Dove by Iain Softley

Special Presentations
 Afterglow by Alan Rudolph
 Le Bassin de J.W. by João César Monteiro
 The Big One by Michael Moore
 The Blackout by Abel Ferrara
 The Blood Oranges by Philip Haas
 Boogie Nights by Paul Thomas Anderson
 Face by Antonia Bird
 Fast, Cheap & Out of Control by Errol Morris
 Hana-bi by Takeshi Kitano
 4 Little Girls by Spike Lee
 Henry Fool by Hal Hartley
 The House of Yes by Mark Waters
 The Informant by Jim McBride
 Inspirations by Michael Apted
 The Alarmist by Evan Dunsky
 Loved by Erin Dignam
 Mr. Jealousy by Noah Baumbach
 My Best Girl by Sam Taylor
 Nil by Mouth by Gary Oldman
 One Night Stand by Mike Figgis
 Pronto by Jim McBride
 The Spanish Prisoner by David Mamet
 Suicide Kings by Peter O'Fallon
 The Tango Lesson by Sally Potter
 Two Girls and a Guy by James Toback
 Welcome to Sarajevo by Michael Winterbottom
 Year of the Horse by Jim Jarmusch

Masters
 Das Schloß by Michael Haneke
 Iruvar by Mani Ratnam
 Esmeralda Comes by Night by Jaime Humberto Hermosillo
 Funny Games by Michael Haneke
 Voyage to the Beginning of the World by Manoel de Oliveira
 Keep Cool by Zhang Yimou
 Mon oncle Antoine by Claude Jutra
 Moon Over Broadway by Chris Hegedus, D. A. Pennebaker
 Mother and Son by Alexander Sokurov
 The Scar by Krzysztof Kieślowski
 The Eel by Shōhei Imamura

Perspective Canada
 The Absent One by Céline Baril
 Across by Cara Morton
 Anna à la lettre C by Hugo Brochu
 The Big Pickle by Gary Yates
 bp: pushing the boundaries by Brian Nash
 Breakfast with Gus by Siobhan Devine
 Bury Me Happy by Brian McPhail
 City of Dark by Bruno Lazaro
 The Countess of Baton Rouge by André Forcier
 Cosmos by Manon Briand, André Turpin, Marie-Julie Dallaire, Denis Villeneuve, Jennifer Alleyn, Arto Paragamian
 Cotton Candy by Roshell Bissett
 Cube by Vincenzo Natali
 Dance with Me by Cassandra Nicolaou
 Drive, She Said by Mina Shum
 Drowning in Dreams by Tim Southam
 Erotica: A Journey Into Female Sexuality by Maya Gallus
 Fresh Off the Boat by Peter Demas
 Gerrie & Louise by Sturla Gunnarsson
 Grace Eternal by Neil Burns
 Guise by Wrik Mead
 Guy Maddin: Waiting for Twilight by Noam Gonick
 The Hanging Garden by Thom Fitzgerald
 Hayseed by Josh Levy and Andrew Hayes
 The Hazards of Falling Glass by John Martins-Manteiga
 Incantation by Cara Morton
 Kid Nerd by Shereen Jerrett
 Kitchen Party by Gary Burns
 Linear Dreams by Richard Reeves 
 The Mao Lounge by Chad Derrick
 Men with Guns by Kari Skogland
 Museum by Chris Walsh 
 1919 by Noam Gonick
 Permission by Daniel MacIvor
 Pitch by Spencer Rice and Kenny Hotz
 The Planet of Junior Brown by Clement Virgo
 Question of Reality by Barry Gibson
 The Seat of the Soul by Olivier Asselin
 Shift by Shaun Cathcart
 Shooting Indians: A Journey with Jeffrey Thomas by Ali Kazimi
 Shopping for Fangs by Quentin Lee, Justin Lin
 The Skating Party by Marcia Connolly, Janet Hawkwood
 The Swimming Lesson by Sheri Elwood
 Tu as crié: Let me go by Anne Claire Poirier
 Twilight of the Ice Nymphs by Guy Maddin
 Two Feet, One Angel by Ramiro Puerta
 Uncut by John Greyson
 La vie arrêtée by Martine Allard
 We Are Experiencing... by John Kneller
 What Goes Around by Lloyd Surdi
 White Cloud, Blue Mountain by Keith Behrman
 Zie 37 Stagen by Sylvain Guy

Contemporary World Cinema
 The Assistant by Daniel Petrie
 Bird Watching by Shinobu Yaguchi
 Blinded by Daniel Calparsoro
 Brain Holiday by Hineki Mito
 Brother by Aleksei Balabanov
 Love, Math and Sex by Charlotte Silvera
 Character by Mike van Diem
 Clandestins by Denis Chouinard, Nicolas Wadimoff
 Close To by David Ottenhouse
 Conceiving Ada by Lynn Hershman Leeson
 Delirium by Peque Gallaga, Lore Reyes
 Devil's Island by Friðrik Þór Friðriksson
 Doing Time for Patsy Cline by Chris Kennedy
 East Palace, West Palace by Zhang Yuan
 Four Days in September by Bruno Barreto
 A Friend of the Deceased by Viatcheslav Krichtofovitch, Leonid Boyko 
 Un frère... by Sylvie Verheyde
 The Girl with Brains in Her Feet by Roberto Bangura
 Gummo by Harmony Korine
 Hanoi-Winter 1946 by Đặng Nhật Minh
 Happy Together by Wong Kar-wai
 Heaven's Burning by Craig Lahiff
 Homesick Eyes by Hsu Hsiao-ming
 I Think I Do by Brian Sloan
 Silvester Countdown by Oskar Roehler
 Inside/Out by Robert Tregenza
 Insomnia by Erik Skjoldbjærg
 The James Gang by Mike Barker
 Junk Food by Masashi Yamamoto
 Junk Mail by Pål Sletaune
 Keep the Aspidistra Flying by Robert Bierman
 Kiss or Kill by Bill Bennett
 Labyrinth of Dreams by Gakuryū Ishii
 The Leading Hand by Masahiro Muramatsu
 Long Twilight by Attila Janisch
 Love and Death on Long Island by Richard Kwietniowski
 Ma vie en rose by Alain Berliner
 Majorettes in Space by David Fourier
 The Maker by Tim Hunter
 The Man in Her Life by Carlos Siguion-Reyna
 Marius and Jeannette by Robert Guédiguian
 Metroland by Philip Saville
 The Mirror by Jafar Panahi
 Misfortune's End by Vu Xuan Hung
 Murmur of Youth by Lin Cheng-sheng
 The Myth of Fingerprints by Bart Freundlich
 Nettoyage à sec by Anne Fontaine
 No Child of Mine by Peter Kosminsky
 Obsession by Peter Sehr
 Okke-ke Bibirobos by Takuji Suzuki
 Onibi by Rokurō Mochizuki
 Our Boy by David Evans
 The Oyster and the Wind by Walter Lima, Jr.
 Ashes of Paradise by Marcelo Piñeyro
 Passage by Juraj Herz
 Port Djema by Eric Heumann
 After Sex by Brigitte Roüan
 Private Confessions by Liv Ullmann
 Rizal sa Dapitan by Tikoy Aguiluz
 The Rocking Horse Winner by Michael Almereyda
 The Soong Sisters by Mabel Cheung
 Stolen Moments by Oscar Barney Finn
 Sue Lost in Manhattan by Amos Kollek
 Suzaku by Naomi Kawase
 Telling Lies in America by Guy Ferland
 Their Last Love Affair by Lee Myung-se
 They Call Me Joy by Carlos Siguion-Reyna
 Thirteen by David D. Williams 
 Touch Me by H. Gordon Boos
 Touch Me Not by Dimitrios Yatzouzakis
 La Vérité si je mens ! by Thomas Gilou
 Vertical Love by Arturo Sotto Díaz
 La Vie de Jésus by Bruno Dumont
 Le voleur de diagonale by Jean Darrigol
 We All Fall Down by Davide Ferrario
 Western by Manuel Poirier
 Winter Sleepers by Tom Tykwer
 The Witman Boys by János Szász
 Wolves Cry Under the Moon by Ho Ping
 Yours and Mine by Wang Shaudi

Discovery
 Bandits by Katja von Garnier
 Belly Up by Beto Brant
 Clockwatchers by Jill Sprecher
 First Love, Last Rites by Jesse Peretz
 Guilt Free by Marcel Sisniega Campbell
 The Impostor by Alejandro Maci
 In Praise of Older Women by Manuel Lombardero
 Life According to Muriel by Eduardo Milewicz
 The Life of Stuff by Simon Donald
 Lover Girl by Lisa Addario, Joe Syracuse
 Marie Baie des Anges by Manuel Pradal
 Martha's Garden by Peter Liechti
 Perfumed Ball by Lírio Ferreira, Paulo Caldas
 Scars by James Herbert
 Somersault in a Coffin by Derviş Zaim
 The Sticky Fingers of Time by Hilary Brougher
 Stone, Scissors, Paper by Stephen Whittaker
 Traveler from the South by Parviz Shahbazi
 Twenty Four Seven by Shane Meadows
 Under the Skin by Carine Adler
 Unmade Beds by Nicholas Barker
 Who the Hell Is Juliette? by Carlos Marcovich
 Words of Wisdom by Susanna Fogel

Planet Africa
 Breeze by Barbara Sanon
 Buud Yam by Gaston Kaboré
 The Draughtsmen Clash by Balufu Bakupa-Kanyinda
 Dancehall Queen by Don Letts, Rick Elgood
 Destiny by Youssef Chahine
 Fools by Ramadan Suleman
 Hav Plenty by Christopher Scott Cherot
 Honey and Ashes by Nadia Farès
 Martin Luther King: Days of Hope by John Akomfrah
 Mossane by Safi Faye
 Sabriya by Abderrahmane Sissako
 Taafé Fanga by Adama Drabo
 Through the Door of No Return by Shirikiana Aina
 To Be a Black Man by Nelson George

Real to Reel
 Best Man: 'Best Boy' and All of Us Twenty Years Later by Ira Wohl
 Chile, Obstinate Memory by Patricio Guzmán
 HHH - Un portrait de Hou Hsiao-Hsien by Olivier Assayas
 Didn't Do It for Love by Monika Treut
 Exile in Sarajevo by Tahir Cambis, Alma Sahbaz
 Exile Shanghai by Ulrike Ottinger
 From Son to Salsa by Rigoberto López
 Full Tilt Boogie by Sarah Kelly
 Marcello Mastroianni: I Remember by Anna Maria Tatò
 My House Is on Fire by Ariel Dorfman, Rodrigo Dorfman
 As Time Goes By by Ann Hui, Vincent Chui 
 Still Love You After All These by Stanley Kwan
 Robinson in Space by Patrick Keiller

Dialogues: Talking with Pictures
 Detour by Edgar G. Ulmer, presented by Errol Morris
 The Devil-Doll by Tod Browning, presented by Guy Maddin
 Dont Look Back by D. A. Pennebaker, presented by Chris Hegedus
 F for Fake by Orson Welles, presented by James Toback
 The Fireman's Ball by Miloš Forman, presented by Friðrik Þór Friðriksson
 Les Girls by George Cukor, presented by Jaime Humberto Hermosillo
 One Flew Over The Cuckoo's Nest by Miloš Forman, presented by Chow Yun-fat
 The Organizer by Mario Monicelli, presented by John Sayles
 A Matter of Life and Death by Michael Powell, Emeric Pressburger, presented by Sally Potter

Balkan Cinema: Home Truths
 Across the Lake by Antonio Mitrikeski
 The Awkward Age by Nenad Dizdarević
 Belated Full Moon by Eduard Zahariev
 The Days on Earth Are Flowing by Goran Paskaljević
 The End of the War by Dragan Kresoja
 An Unforgettable Summer by Lucian Pintilie
 Felix by Božo Šprajc
 The Goat Horn by Metodi Andonov
 How the War Started on My Island by Vinko Brešan
 The Perfect Circle by Ademir Kenović
 Petria's Wreath by Srđan Karanović
 Pretty Village, Pretty Flame by Srđan Dragojević
 Thalassa, Thalassa by Bogdan Dumitrescu
 Tired Companions by Zoran Solomun
 Tito and Me by Goran Marković
 Underground by Emir Kusturica
 Vukovar Poste Restante by Boro Drašković
 Who's Singin' Over There? by Slobodan Šijan
 W.R.: Mysteries of the Organism by Dušan Makavejev

Spotlight: Benoît Jacquot
 The Musician Killer by Benoît Jacquot
 Corps et biens by Benoît Jacquot
 La désenchantée by Benoît Jacquot
 A Single Girl by Benoît Jacquot
 Marianne by Benoît Jacquot
 Seventh Heaven by Benoît Jacquot

Nathan Phillips Square Outdoor Screening
 Gentlemen Prefer Blondes by Howard Hawks

Midnight Madness
 A Chinese Ghost Story: The Tsui Hark Animation by Andrew Chan
 Fudoh: The New Generation by Takashi Miike
 I Married a Strange Person! by Bill Plympton
 Love God by Frank Grow
 Office Killer by Cindy Sherman
 Orgazmo by Trey Parker
 SICK: The Life & Death of Bob Flanagan, Supermasochist by Kirby Dick
 The Ugly by Scott Reynolds

References

External links
 Official site
 1997 Toronto International Film Festival at IMDb

1997 film festivals
1997
1997 in Toronto
1997 in Canadian cinema
1997 festivals in North America